Rembrandt is a city in Buena Vista County, Iowa, United States. The population was 209 at the time of the 2020 census.

Geography
Rembrandt is located at 42°49'35" North, 95°9'57" West (42.826417, -95.165927).

Demographics

2010 census
As of the census of 2010, there were 203 people, 89 households, and 53 families living in the city. The racial makeup of the city was 97.0% White, 0.5% African American, 1.5% from other races, and 1.0% from two or more races. Hispanic or Latino of any race were 3.9% of the population.

There were 89 households, of which 29.2% had children under the age of 18 living with them, 43.8% were married couples living together, 10.1% had a female householder with no husband present, 5.6% had a male householder with no wife present, and 40.4% were non-families. 37.1% of all households were made up of individuals, and 10.1% had someone living alone who was 65 years of age or older. The average household size was 2.28 and the average family size was 2.92.

The median age in the city was 37.8 years. 28.1% of residents were under the age of 18; 7.9% were between the ages of 18 and 24; 21.1% were from 25 to 44; 33% were from 45 to 64; and 9.9% were 65 years of age or older. The gender makeup of the city was 48.8% male and 51.2% female.

2000 census
As of the census of 2000, there were 228 people, 96 households, and 59 families living in the city. The racial makeup of the city was 100.00% White.

There were 96 households, out of which 32.3% had children under the age of 18 living with them, 54.2% were married couples living together, 4.2% had a female householder with no husband present, and 38.5% were non-families. 36.5% of all households were made up of individuals, and 15.6% had someone living alone who was 65 years of age or older. The average household size was 2.38 and the average family size was 3.17.

Age spread: 28.5% under the age of 18, 9.6% from 18 to 24, 24.6% from 25 to 44, 21.5% from 45 to 64, and 15.8% who were 65 years of age or older. The median age was 37 years. For every 100 females, there were 94.9 males. For every 100 females age 18 and over, there were 94.0 males.

The median income for a household in the city was $34,375, and the median income for a family was $50,417. Males had a median income of $31,500 versus $17,500 for females. The per capita income for the city was $17,248. None of the families and 4.0% of the population were living below the poverty line, including no under eighteens and 7.4% of those over 64.

Education
Sioux Central Community School District serves the community.

Rembrandt was a part of the Rembrandt Community School District until July 1, 1979, when it merged with the Sioux Rapids school district to form the Sioux Rapids-Rembrandt School District. That district consolidated with the Sioux Valley School District into Sioux Central on July 1, 1993.

References

Cities in Buena Vista County, Iowa
Cities in Iowa